Ernest Watts (fl. 1889) was an English footballer born in Birmingham who played in the Football Alliance for Small Heath. After Small Heath's 9–1 defeat against The Wednesday in the inaugural season of the Football Alliance, Watts was given a couple of games at inside right at Christmas 1889, but he made no improvement to the side.

Notes

References

Year of birth missing
Year of death missing
Footballers from Birmingham, West Midlands
English footballers
Association football inside forwards
Birmingham City F.C. players
Football Alliance players
Place of death missing